The discography of American rapper Young Thug consists of two studio albums, two compilation albums, twelve mixtapes, seven commercial mixtapes, three extended plays, and sixty-nine singles (including 71 as a featured artist).

In 2015, Thug released his debut mixtape, Barter 6, which reached number 22 on the Billboard 200. His 2016 mixtape, I'm Up matched the same position. That same year, Thug saw an increase with his mixtape, Slime Season 3, which rose to number seven. His final mixtape of the year, Jeffery, dropped down by one position at number eight. In 2017, his mixtape, Beautiful Thugger Girls, matched the same position. That same year, his collaborative mixtape with Future, Super Slimey reached number two on the Billboard 200. In 2018, Thug released his collaborative compilation album with his record label, YSL Records, Slime Language, which hit number eight. His second extended play, On the Rvn, was released later that year, and fell back at number 17. Thug released his debut studio album, So Much Fun, in 2019, which debuted and peaked atop the Billboard 200, marking his first chart-topping album. In 2020, he released his collaborative mixtape with Chris Brown, Slime & B, which fell back at number 24. Thug released his collaborative compilation album with YSL and label signee Gunna, a sequel to Slime Language, in 2021, which marked his second number-one album on the Billboard 200. Later that year, he released his second studio album, Punk, which became his third number-one album and second consecutive number-one album.

Thug has earned three chart-topping singles on the Billboard Hot 100, all of which he is a featured artist on. In 2017, he earned his first number-one single from Camila Cabello's single, "Havana". He would later earn his second single that would reach the first position the Hot 100 in 2020 from Travis Scott's single, "Franchise", which also features M.I.A. He earned his third chart-topping single from Drake's single, "Way 2 Sexy", which also features Future.

Albums

Studio albums

Compilation albums

Mixtapes

Self-released mixtapes

Commercial mixtapes

Extended plays

Singles

As lead artist

As featured artist

Other charted and certified songs

Guest appearances

Music videos

See also
Bankroll Mafia discography

Notes

References

External links
 
 
 

Discographies of American artists
Hip hop discographies
Discography